Noha Al-Sharif (born 1980) is a Saudi Arabian sculptor. Cited by Arab News as "an expert in Islamic sculpture", she is noted for sculptures with Islamic themes, using porcelain and textile.

Al-Sharif is well read in Arabic, Indian Chinese and Egyptian Art. She graduated from the Jeddah College of Fine Arts in 2004. In 2011 she studied Asian art at the School of Oriental and African Studies in London and has since studied Islamic Art at Winchester University. She often makes black figurines of women during Islamic prayer  such as Jamaa, a group of small women figurines made of marble and resin, between 5 cm and 15 cm in height, and Humbly and devout, a group of four small women figurines which she made in 2008 after taking photographs of women in "abaya". Al-Sharif has stated of her work: "My sculpture so far has been essentially autobiographic, my life in Makkah. To make sculpture out of this background is controversial, but for me it is based in faith and religious and deeply personal. It is that which I explore in my art, out of my experience of life in Makkah where I have lived for much of my life. My sculptures come very precisely from my religious life in the Holy City, even if what I do is not at all conventional in terms of Islamic art and in fact, quite the opposite." She has exhibited her work as part of a group called "Edge of Arabia", including London in 2008, Riyadh and Istanbul in 2010 and Jeddah in 2012.

References

Saudi Arabian women sculptors
Saudi Arabian sculptors
1980 births
Living people
People from Mecca
21st-century sculptors
21st-century women artists